Speranza schatzeata is a species of geometrid moth in the family Geometridae.

The MONA or Hodges number for Speranza schatzeata is 6310.

References

Further reading

 

Macariini
Articles created by Qbugbot
Moths described in 1927